Chatsworth is an electoral district of the Legislative Assembly in the Australian state of Queensland. The electorate is centred on the south-eastern suburbs of Brisbane and stretches north to Tingalpa, west to Carina Heights, east to Tingalpa Creek and south to Bulimba Creek.

Unusually for a suburban seat, the district of Chatsworth is not named after a suburb within its boundaries but is instead named after Chatsworth Road. This is despite the fact Chatsworth Road does not fall within the present district of Chatsworth; it runs through the neighbouring district of Greenslopes.

Members for Chatsworth

Election results

References

External links
 Electorate profile (Antony Green, ABC)

Chatsworth